William George Osborne Thompson was a Canadian Anglican priest in the 20th Century.

Rigby was educated at the Trinity College, Toronto and ordained in 1912. After a curacy at St Matthew, Toronto he held incumbencies at Beamsville, Riverstown, Stoney Creek and Port Colborne. He was  Archdeacon of Wellington, ON from 1944 to 1954.

References

Trinity College (Canada) alumni
Archdeacons of Wellington, ON
20th-century Canadian Anglican priests